is a subway station on the  in Roppongi, Minato, Tokyo, Japan, operated by the Tokyo subway operator Tokyo Metro.

Lines
Roppongi-itchome Station is served by the Namboku Line which goes from Meguro to Akabane Iwabuchi, and is numbered "N-05".

Station layout
The station concourse and ticket machines are located on the second basement ("B2F") level. The station has one island platform located on the 4th basement ("B4F") level, serving two tracks. It also has 3 exits that lead to different places.

Platforms

History 
Roppongi-itchome Station opened on 26 September 2000 on the Namboku line.

The station facilities were inherited by Tokyo Metro after the privatization of the Teito Rapid Transit Authority (TRTA) in 2004.

Passenger statistics
In 2019, the station was used by an average of 88,958 passengers daily.

Surrounding area
The main station exit is connected directly to basement levels of the Izumi Garden Tower building.
 Ark Hills
 Suntory Hall
 Izumi Garden Tower
 Sumitomo Fudosan Roppongi Grand Tower
 TV Asahi studios
 TV Tokyo studios

Embassies
 The Embassy of the Federated States of Micronesia
 The Embassy of Spain
 The Embassy of Saudi Arabia
 The Embassy of Sweden
 The Embassy of the United States

Schools
 Azabu Elementary School

Hotels
 ANA Intercontinental Tokyo
 Hotel Okura Tokyo
 Hotel Villa Fontaine Tokyo
 Roppongi Prince Hotel

See also
 List of railway stations in Japan

References

External links

  

Railway stations in Japan opened in 2000
Railway stations in Tokyo
Tokyo Metro Namboku Line
Roppongi
Buildings and structures in Minato, Tokyo